The Palestinian Legislative Council (PLC) currently has 132 members following the legislative election on 25 January 2006. This is a list of PLC members, arranged by electoral district. As of 31 December 2010, 15 members have been imprisoned by Israeli authorities and three are deceased.

List of members

References 
General

Specific

Current